Phantoms is the fifth studio album released by Canadian rock band Marianas Trench. It was released on March 1, 2019 through 604 Records in Canada and Interscope Records internationally. The album saw another new style for the band, going for a more haunted and ghostly like sound as opposed to the more fantastical sound on their previous work, Astoria, which is where the title of Phantoms comes from.

Background
In 2015, Marianas Trench released their fourth studio album Astoria, with the lead single, "One Love", reaching the top 100 on the Billboard Canada singles chart. The second single, "This Means War", was their first single to not hit top 100 in Canada. Marianas Trench performed at the New Year celebrations in Niagara Falls, Ontario in 2017.

In the fall of 2017, the single "Rhythm of Your Heart" was released. On March 15, 2018, the music video for "Rhythm of Your Heart" premiered on YouTube. On November 5, 2018, the band announced the lead single off their upcoming fifth album, "I Knew You When", which was later released on November 16. On December 3, 2018, the band announced the US Suspending Gravity Tour to promote their upcoming album Phantoms. The music video for "I Knew You When" was released on YouTube on December 19, 2018. On January 31, 2019, their second single from Phantoms, "Only the Lonely Survive", was premiered on YouTube. On February 7, 2019, the third released single from Phantoms, "Echoes Of You", featuring Roger Joseph Manning Jr., was premiered on YouTube.

Concept and sound
Phantoms has been described by the band as "being haunted by the ghosts of former love." Josh Ramsay describes the new record as "modern-song writing, but very organic, old-school approaches and trickery...done in a way that you haven't heard us do before." "It's about messy, real-life love with consequences; the kind of relationship that takes years to build," Ramsay sums up. And for him, it's personal. "Fun fact: every love song I've ever written is about the same girl." Although Phantoms draws inspiration from a decidedly personal place, however: "It's not like you're just listening in on someone else's life. Everybody has that experience. That's just living. And Phantoms, I think, will allow people to connect on their own level, with their own story, to the ones that we're sharing."

Promotion
Marianas Trench went on the Suspending Gravity Tour in order to promote the album.

Reception
Phantoms has mostly received positive reviews from critics. Shannon Shumaker said "Each song on Phantoms stands alone as a masterpiece, and when combined, it makes for a very dramatic, exciting listen. Although the massive sounds on the album can sometimes feel a bit overwhelming, and the more energetic songs might sound a bit similar, it's the little stand-out moments throughout the album that make it special. From the spectacular high vocals on 'Don't Miss Me?' to the retro guitar work on 'Your Ghost' and the massive chorus on 'I Knew You When,' there's a spark to each and every song on the album that makes it fun to listen to."

Track listing

Personnel
Credits for Phantoms adapted from AllMusic.

Marianas Trench
 Josh Ramsay – vocals, guitar, piano, drums, bass, programming
 Matt Webb – guitar, vocals
 Mike Ayley – bass, vocals
 Ian Casselman – drums, percussion, vocals

Additional musicians
 Roger Manning – additional vocals
 Nik Pesut – drums

Production
 Josh Ramsay – producer, arrangement, composer, engineering, mixing
 Garnet Armstrong - art direction, design
 Julie Baldwin – management
 Zach Blackstone – engineering, assistant
 Ralph James - booking
 Ted Jensen – mastering
 Ivan Otis – photography
 Benny Ramsay - executive producer
 Jets Ramsay - executive producer
 Dave Rave - mixing
 Jonathan Simkin - A&R, management
 David Sullivan-Kaplan - booking
 Karolina Turek - band photography
 Fred Webb - assistant

Charts

References 

2019 albums
Marianas Trench (band) albums
604 Records albums